Train Advise Assist Command – Air (TAAC – Air) was a multinational military formation, part of NATO's Resolute Support Mission within Afghanistan.

Contributing nations included Australia, Croatia, Czech Republic, Denmark, Germany, Greece, Hungary, Romania, Slovakia, Sweden, Turkey, United Kingdom, and the United States of America.

Commanders
 Brigadier Gen. Michael D. Rothstein (August 2014 - 27 July 2015)
 Brigadier Gen. Christopher E. Craige (July 2015 - June 2016)
 Brigadier Gen. Phillip A. Stewart (June 2017 - June 2018)
 Brigadier Gen. Joel L. Carey (June 2018 - June 2019)
 Brigadier Gen. Jeffery D. Valenzia (June 2019 - ??)

Major units assigned 
438th Air Expeditionary Wing, Forward Operating Base Oqab, Kabul
438th Air Expeditionary Advisory Group, Kabul Air Wing
738th Air Expeditionary Advisory Group, Kandahar Air Field

See also
 Train Advise Assist Command – Capital
 Train Advise Assist Command – North
 Train Advise Assist Command – East
 Train Advise Assist Command – South
 Train Advise Assist Command – West

References

External links

Resolute Support Mission units and formations (Afghanistan)